William Merz Sinton (April 11, 1925 – March 16, 2004) was a Harvard astronomer whose 1950s studies seemed to support the existence of Martian vegetation. A crater on Mars is named after him. He received many awards and recognitions, including the 1954 Adolph Lomb Medal from OSA. He was also elected an OSA Fellow in 1961. During his lifetime, he published over 100 scientific papers and two books.

Works

References

American astronomers
1925 births
2004 deaths
Johns Hopkins University alumni
Harvard University staff